USS Narada (SP-161) was a steam yacht that served in the United States Navy as a patrol vessel from 1917 to 1919.

Narada was built as the wooden-hulled, steam-powered civilian yacht SS Semiramis by Ramage & Ferguson at Leith, Scotland, being launched on 30 May 1889. She later was renamed SS Margarita and then SS Narada. The U.S. Navy purchased Narada from her owner, Mr. Henry D. Walters of Baltimore, Maryland, on 30 June 1917 for use as a patrol vessel during World War I. She was commissioned on 12 October 1917 as USS Narada (SP-161).

During her entire period of naval service, Narada was based at New London, Connecticut, for experimental submarine signal work.

After completion of this service, Narada departed for New York City, arriving there on 13 January 1919. She was decommissioned the same day and returned to her owner on 4 February 1919.

Notes

References

Department of the Navy Naval Historical Center Online Library of Selected Images: U.S. Navy Ships: USS Narada (SP-161), 1917-1919. Previously a civilian yacht named Semiramis, Margarita and Narada.
NavSource Online: Section Patrol Craft Photo Archive: Narada (SP 161)

Patrol vessels of the United States Navy
World War I patrol vessels of the United States
Narada
Individual yachts
1889 ships